Guns of Darkness is a 1962 British drama film directed by Anthony Asquith and starring David Niven, Leslie Caron and James Robertson Justice. It is based on the 1960 novel Act of Mercy by Francis Clifford, which was retitled Guns of Darkness for the American market.

Plot summary
Caught in a South American country during a coup, a British couple try to help the ousted president escape to the frontier.

Cast
 Leslie Caron - Claire Jordan 
 David Niven - Tom Jordan 
 James Robertson Justice - Hugo Bryant 
 David Opatoshu - President Rivera 
 Derek Godfrey - Hernandez 
 Ian Hunter - Dr. Swann 
 Richard Pearson - Bastian 
 Eleanor Summerfield - Mrs. Bastian 
 Sandor Elès - Lieutenant Gomez

References

External links
 
 
 

1962 films
1962 drama films
British drama films
Films shot at Associated British Studios
Films directed by Anthony Asquith
Films scored by Benjamin Frankel
Films set in South America
Films based on British novels
1960s English-language films
1960s British films